Burçin Terzioğlu  (born 9 March 1980) is a Turkish actress.

Biography 
Her family works in cinema industry. Terzioğlu began acting at the age of five as a child actress, appearing in 45 films and 16 television series until the age of ten. She played in numerous hit series and films since childhood. Her first popular adult 
role is in hit revenge series "Kadın İsterse". She won Golden Butterfly Best Actress Award for Poyraz Karayel.

Terzioğlu was married to her  co-star Murat Yıldırım from 2008 to 2014.

Filmography

Movies

Web series

TV series

Awards and nominations

TV survey achievements and nominations

References

External links 

1980 births
Living people
Actresses from Istanbul
Turkish film actresses
Turkish television actresses
Turkish child actresses
Golden Butterfly Award winners